This article is about the particular significance of the year 2017 to Wales and its people.

Incumbents

First Minister – Carwyn Jones
Secretary of State for Wales – Alun Cairns
Archbishop of Wales – Barry Morgan, Bishop of Llandaff; John Davies, Bishop of Swansea and Brecon, from 6 September
Archdruid of the National Eisteddfod of Wales – Geraint Llifon
National Poet of Wales – Ifor ap Glyn

Events

January
1 January – Wales football manager Chris Coleman is revealed as the Nos Galan runner at the traditional New Year event in the Cynon Valley.
27 January – A farewell service is held at Llandaff Cathedral for retiring Archbishop of Wales Barry Morgan.

February
February – It is announced that Coleg Harlech will close as an adult education site at the end of the academic year.
9 February – Christina Rees returns to the Labour front bench as Shadow Secretary of State for Wales.
22 February – The British government confirms that in future MPs will be able to use the Welsh language during meetings of the Welsh Grand Committee.

March
13 March – A petition by the parents of April Jones, calling for sex offenders to remain on the register for life, is debated in Parliament. 
30 March – Olympic cyclist Ciara Horne is injured in a traffic accident in Pontyclun, when a car collides with her bicycle.

April
1 April – Sir Tom Jones is criticised for swearing audibly on live television during the final of The Voice UK.
6 April – Mark Reckless AM quits UKIP and will now support the Conservative Party group in the National Assembly for Wales.
21 April – Labour leader Jeremy Corbyn launches his general election campaign with a rally in Cardiff.
27 April – June Osborne is named as the new Bishop of Llandaff.
30 April – Ten men are arrested after a man dies following a violent altercation in Rhyl.

May

4 May – Local elections in Wales, taking place concurrently with Scotland and parts of England. Labour lost control of Blaenau Gwent and Bridgend councils, while the Conservatives gained a majority in Monmouthshire.
13 May – Welsh singer Lucie Jones represents the UK in the final of the Eurovision Song Contest 2017, finishing in 15th place.
18 May
Tributes are paid to Wales's former First Minister Rhodri Morgan by politicians from all parties, including Jeremy Corbyn, Leanne Wood and Lord German.
The Welsh Assembly's Culture, Welsh Language and Communications Committee concludes that plans to double the number of Welsh speakers to one million by 2050 carry a "risk that this may have a distortive effect on the delivery of educational priorities as the system is realigned to be able to deliver the language strategy".
22 May – Welsh Labour launches its manifesto with a promise to support the construction of a new nuclear power station, Wylfa Newydd.
27 May – The 30th Hay Festival commences. Guest speakers at this year's event include Bernie Sanders, Stephen Fry, Garry Kasparov, Tracey Emin, Charlotte Rampling and Neil Gaiman.
29 May – The first day of the Urdd National Eisteddfod begins in Pencoed, Bridgend, with hopes of attracting around 100,000 visitors.

June
14 June 
In an accident at an army firing range in Castlemartin, Pembrokeshire, two members of the Royal Tank Regiment are killed by an explosion in a Challenger 2 tank.
A reshuffle of Jeremy Corbyn's shadow cabinet results in former leadership rival Owen Smith, MP for Pontypridd, taking responsibility for Northern Ireland.
16 June – Welsh people honoured in the Queen's Birthday Honours list include Malcolm Walker, co-founder of the Iceland chain (knighthood) and senior nurse Professor Jean Christine White (CBE).
19 June – Darren Osborne, a 47-year-old Cardiff resident, is arrested after driving a van hired from Pontyclun into a group of Muslim men in Finsbury Park, London, injuring at least ten people.
20 June – Richard Evans, son of the proprietor of Pontyclun Van Hire, is arrested after making offensive remarks on Facebook about the Finsbury Park incident.

July
13 July - Stephen Hough is convicted of the killing of Flintshire schoolgirl Janet Commins, 41 years after her death. Noel Jones, an illiterate gypsy boy, had admitted killing Commins and had served half of a 12-year prison sentence, but told the court he had been made a scapegoat by police.
15 July - June Osborne is enthroned as Bishop of Llandaff, the first woman to hold the position.
22 July - Michelle Brown, UKIP Assembly member for north Wales, admits and apologises for using a racial slur in a telephone conversation, after her former assistant Nigel Williams released a recording of the call.

August
7 August - Wet weather affects the start of the 2017 National Eisteddfod of Wales at Bodedern on Anglesey. A Park-and-Ride system is used to ferry visitors to the Maes.

September
6 September - John Davies, Bishop of Swansea and Brecon, is elected Archbishop of Wales.
26 September - Cardiff's Sherman Theatre is criticised for appointing a non-Welsh speaker as its new associate director. Manon Eames of the Writers' Guild of Great Britain and actor Ifan Huw Dafydd both claim that the Arts Council of Wales is spending too much of its budget outside the principality. 
30 September - Ospreys rugby player Scott Baldwin has to miss a game after being bitten on the hand by a captive lion at Weltevrede Game Lodge near Bloemfontein, South Africa.

October
2 October - Secretary of State for Wales Alun Cairns attacks First Minister Carwyn Jones in a speech, accusing him of being "obsessed with power".

November
3 November - Welsh Assembly minister Carl Sargeant is suspended by the Labour Party pending an investigation into allegations of sexual misconduct.
16 November - Michael Sheen gives the annual Raymond Williams Memorial Lecture at Merthyr Tydfil. Much later, Sheen will reveal that he returned his OBE before giving the lecture, in order to avoid being hypocritical.
17 November - Chris Coleman announces his resignation as manager of the Wales national football team.

Arts and literature

Welsh Awards
Glyndŵr Award 
National Eisteddfod of Wales: Chair – Osian Rhys Jones
National Eisteddfod of Wales: Crown – Gwion Hallam
National Eisteddfod of Wales: Prose Medal – Sonia Edwards
National Eisteddfod of Wales: Drama Medal – Heiddwen Tomos
Gwobr Goffa Daniel Owen: withheld
Wales Book of the Year
English language: Alys Conran, Pigeon
Welsh language: Idris Reynolds, Cofio Dic

New books

English language
Tony Curtis – Some Kind of Immortality
Joe England - Merthyr, The Crucible of Modern Wales
Ken Follett – Edge of Eternity (2014)
Mike Jenkins – Sofa Surfin
Cynan Jones - Cove
Johnny Tudor – My Heart is Bleeding – The Life of Dorothy Squires

Welsh language
Haf Llewelyn – I Wyneb y Ddrycin – Hedd Wyn, Yr Ysgwrn a'r Rhyfel Mawr
Peredur Lynch – Caeth a Rhydd
Mihangel Morgan – 60

Music
Paul Mealor – Euphonium Concerto, commissioned by the Welsh Proms and premièred by David Childs (euphonium) and the Royal Philharmonic Orchestra conducted by Owain Arwel Hughes at St David's Hall, Cardiff, on 29 July.
Huw Watkins – Symphony, premièred by the Hallé Orchestra at the Bridgewater Hall, Manchester, on 20 April.

Film

Sport

Awards

BBC Cymru Wales Sports Personality of the Year - Jonathan Davies

In sports
Horse Racing
27 December - the 2017 Welsh Grand National is abandoned due to waterlogging and postponed to 6 January 2018.
Road cycling
21 April – Geraint Thomas wins the 2017 Tour of the Alps, becoming the first British cyclist to win the race.
Rugby Union
18 March – Wales finish fifth in the 2017 Six Nations Championship, having lost three of their five matches.
19 April – Sam Warburton is named as captain of the 2017 British & Irish Lions tour to New Zealand, becoming only the second player to captain the Lions on two tours.
Track cycling
16 April – Elinor Barker wins the World Championship in the Women's points race.

Broadcasting

English-language television
Beti and David: Lost for Words
Hedd Wyn: the Lost War Poet

English-language radio
The Black Chair presented by Mab Jones

Welsh-language television
Byw Celwydd, series 2
Un Bore Mercher

Deaths
13 January – Antony Armstrong-Jones, 1st Earl of Snowdon, 86, Welsh-descended photographer and member of the British Royal Family
21 January – Shirley Paget, Marchioness of Anglesey, 92, writer
31 January – Deke Leonard, 72, rock musician (death announced on this date)
21 February – Garel Rhys, 77, academic
25 February
Lloyd Williams, 83, Wales national rugby union team captain.
Elli Norkett, 20, Welsh rugby union international.
1 March – Dai Morgan Evans, 73, English-born archaeologist (cancer)
3 March – Gordon Thomas, 84, Welsh investigative journalist and author
22 March – John Derrick, 54, Glamorgan cricketer (brain tumour)
28 March – Gwilym Prys Davies, Baron Prys-Davies, 93, lawyer and politician
10 April – David Parry-Jones, 83, broadcaster and author
16 April – Michael Bogdanov, 78, theatre director
23 April – Michael Williams, Baron Williams of Baglan, 67, peer and diplomat
12 May – David Thomas, 74, Provincial Assistant Bishop of the Church in Wales
17 May – Rhodri Morgan, politician, First Minister of Wales (2000–2009), 77
20 May – Noel Kinsey, footballer, 91
22 May – Philippa Roles, discus thrower, 39
31 May – Lyn James, Welsh-born Australian actress (The Young Doctors), 87 (death announced on this date)
21 June - John Faull, 83, Wales and British & Irish Lions rugby union international
23 June - John Freeman, 83, rugby player (Halifax R.L.F.C. and Wales)
2 July - Tony Bianchi, 65, author
25 July - Hywel Bennett, 73, actor
4 August - David James Bowen, 91, academic (death announced on this date)
18 August - Duncan Bush, 71, poet and author
18-19 August - Don Shepherd, 90, cricketer
25 September - Aneurin Jones, 87, painter
7 November - Carl Sargeant, 49, politician (suicide)
12 November - Jamie MacDonald, 26, judoka (brain tumour)
21 November - Iola Gregory, 71, actress
26 November - Timothy Stamps, 81, Welsh-born Zimbabwean politician
5 December - Meic Povey, 67, actor and playwright

See also
2017 in Northern Ireland

References

 
2010s in Wales
Years of the 21st century in Wales
Wales